Witchmark is a 2018 fantasy novel by Canadian author C. L. Polk. It features a murder mystery set in an alternate history England, and has been described as gaslamp fantasy. Witchmark won the World Fantasy Award for Best Novel in 2019. It was first published by Tor Books.

Synopsis

In the realm of Aeland, Miles Singer is a psychiatrist who clandestinely uses his magical powers to treat patients in a veterans' hospital. When Tristan Hunter brings in a dying man who tells Miles that he has been murdered, and then the body is cremated before an autopsy can reveal whether anything illegal actually happened, Miles and Tristan begin their own investigation — one which reveals that the secrets at the base of Aeland society are darker than even Miles knew.

Reception

Witchmark won the 2019 World Fantasy Award—Novel. As well, it was a finalist for the 2019 Nebula Award for Best Novel, the 2019 Aurora Award for Best Novel and the 2019 Lambda Literary Award for LGBTQ Science Fiction/Fantasy/Horror.

Publishers Weekly called it "stellar", and praised the quality of Polk's exposition. AudioFile found it to be "charming", with "a rich setting" and "fully developed characters". In the New York Times, Amal el-Mohtar agreed that it was "thoroughly charming" as well as "deftly paced" and "accomplished and enjoyable", but noted that the female characters were "limited to their roles in the story", and stated that although the motivations of Miles' sister Grace were intended to be "opaque", they more often seemed "arbitrary".

Locus considered it a "particularly sterling" instance of fantasy in an Edwardian-equivalent setting, while observing that a "genre-savvy" audience may be disappointed in how long it takes Miles to conclude that the veterans' post-traumatic stress disorder was being exacerbated by magic. Tor.com lauded the worldbuilding and characterization, but faulted it for not resolving the conflict with Miles' colleague Dr. Crosby.

Sequels
Witchmark is the first book of the three-volume Kingston Cycle. The second and third books in the series, Stormsong and Soulstar, were published in 2020 and 2021. The Kingston Cycle as a whole was a finalist for the 2022 Hugo Award for Best Series.

References

External links
[https://www.lapl.org/collections-resources/blogs/lapl/interview-author-cl-polk Interview in which Polk discusses the process of writing Witchmark]
Essay by Polk, exploring the history of bicycles in Aeland

Canadian fantasy novels
2018 Canadian novels
LGBT speculative fiction novels
World Fantasy Award for Best Novel-winning works
2018 debut novels
Canadian LGBT novels
Tor Books books